A Bachelor of Management or a Bachelor of Management Studies (BMgt, BMgmt) is an undergraduate degree for management studies offered by many universities throughout the world. The course allows you to obtain the knowledge and skills needed to assume management positions in a wide range of organizations. Management studies programmes provide students with a solid foundation in organizational behavior and human resource management, and students can further develop their knowledge in specific areas of interest through electives in labor-management relations, negotiation, conflict resolution, compensation systems, and organizational development. In addition to business management courses, this degree program will equip you to understand how organizations work, how they are managed, and how they interact with object-oriented programming using C++ and data structures in national and international environments.

BMS Program structure

Core and Major Curriculum
This programme enables students to develop advanced knowledge and skills in a range of business functions while setting them within the wider context of current business practice.
In the first and second years, students have a variety of choices with an understanding of the role of the core business disciplines:
Accounting
Introduction to finance
Operations and Information management
Human resource management
Introduction to marketing
Micro Economics
Organizational Behaviour
Business Law
In third year, students will study Organizational Strategy and they will have a choice of subjects from a list of options, based on their own interests and career aspirations. These options offer excellent opportunities to gain relevant work experience to prepare for their careers or add an international dimension to their undergraduate study.

Main Course Descriptions 
Introduction To Management
This course gives a brief introduction to the critical management skills involved in planning, structuring, controlling and leading an organization. It provides a framework to help students understand managing and being managed. Thus, leading them to become a more effective contributor to organizations that they join. Students can develop a system view of organizations through examining organizations as part of a context. It aims to train the learners to diagnose and suggest the suitable solutions to various managerial and organizational cases.
Human Resource Management
The focus of this course is to explore the principles of leading and managing people efficiently in today's global enterprises. In this field, students access HR policy and practice in the areas of employment law, job analysis, employee relations and international HRM.
Organizational Behavior
This organizational behaviour course combines classic arguments and contemporary empirical debates by discussing different elements of organizational structure. It introduces theoretical and empirical research on individual, interpersonal and group effectiveness at work. Course topics can be extended from decision making, motivation, leadership, teamwork to organizational culture. The learning method highly focuses on applying the essential tools of human side of management in role-play exercises and group projects in global organizations.
Economics for Management
The objective of the course is to show students how economic theory is related to the applications in managerial decision making and how resources are allocated and coordinated to achieve the organizations' end goal. It emphasizes microeconomics ideas to solve problems and define the main concepts and models used in economic analysis. "Course topics covered include consumer theory, production, applications to the labour market, market structure, monopoly, oligopoly, product differentiation, pricing, decision analysis, bargaining, auctions, and asymmetric information."
Law and Policy
The primary aim of the course is to make students aware of the basic legal concepts and implications affecting business transactions. It fosters a deeper practical sense of how to critically manage the important relationship between business and the natural environment 
Organizational Strategy
The first half of the course studies strategic situations and learn how to utilize the analytical tools to evaluate a firm's position in the industry. Due to the modeling foundation of game theory, students will be tackled  the real-world challenges and build the appropriate action plans .The second half of the course explores the evidence of different managerial styles and the impact on firm process, organizational change and corporate culture that constitute today's collaborative business environments.

Optional Courses
The flexible management courses share a common first year before allowing you to focus on your chosen specialism to enhance your career prospects. The dissertation and optional modules allow students considerable opportunities to focus their studies on areas of special interest.
Students are able to choose some elective modules (optional courses) from a selection list include:
Strategic management
Managerial Economics
Bank Strategy and Management
Entrepreneurship
 Introduction to International Business
Leadership
Advanced Financial Accounting

Placements and Internships
Most of the universities offer an 11 months work placement option or studying abroad opportunity for a four-year degree on management studies. Undertaking the Management Studies Programme will give you the opportunity to gain work experience during your holidays or attend a short-term management training program to strengthen the essential business strategies . The experience of working for a leading institution can be invaluable as it enables students to build strong capabilities to adapt the constantly changing business environments in their future careers. Students will acquire skills and competencies by investigating an issue within a company and producing a complete research report. The programme will give students a clear direction whether they wish to go straight into the job market, or to earn a graduate degree for career advancement.

What job could I be doing for Internships? 
Marketing: Assistant Brand Manager; Technical Marketing Assistant; Media Planner & Buyer
Supply Chain Management: E-commerce Analyst
Banking, Finance and Accountancy: Global Investment Manager; Mergers & Acquisitions Analyst; Audit or Tax Trainee; Treasury Assistant
Human Resources: International Recruitment Consultant; Training Coordinator
IT: Systems Analyst; Project Analyst

Career Options after Bachelor of Management Studies (BMS)

Employability skills
Demonstrating employability skills is crucial to students standing out from the crowd in the face of today's fierce job market competition. Graduates from BMS become equipped with a portfolio of transferable skills which employers in all sectors look for. These include general skills such as being well organized and having effective communication skill, but aptitudes specific to studying Management include:
Business acumen: this course gives students an insight into business practice, financial transactions and commercial ventures. This is valuable because one of the most skills most commonly sought by graduate recruiters is commercial awareness.
Problem solving: most graduate employers look for this quality in potential recruits. Our Management courses teach you specific ways to approach problems and further develop your critical thinking skills.
Ability to use statistics and quantitative methods: for certain graduate jobs such as market research, some areas of banking, and some types of consultancy, knowledge of statistics, quantitative methods and related software packages is a real asset.
Global thinking: the ability to see the bigger picture in a 'whole systems' manner. Useful for strategic roles within a range of organizations.

Career Direction
"In 2009, 65% of graduates from BMS went into full-time employment approximately. 22% work in the commercial, industrial and public management sectors. Others found work as health professionals (14.8%), in retail (14.4%) and marketing (12.5%). " The Bachelor of Management Studies Degree will be relevant in a vast number of professions; particularly within all business related sectors. This course will provide the perfect gateway for a career in:
General business management
Finance
Financial Consulting
Business Analysis
Strategic Management and Planning

See also
Bachelor of Business Administration
Bachelor of Business Management
Bachelor of Accountancy
Bachelor of Economics
Bachelor of Commerce
Bachelor of management studies

References

Management Studies
Management education
Business qualifications